Highfin snapper is a common name for several fish and may refer to:

Symphorus nematophorus
Symphorichthys spilurus

Fish common names